Pleurotoma may refer to:
 Pleurotoma Lamarck, 1799 , a genus of gastropods in the family Turridae, synonym of Turris
 Pleurotoma Mörch, 1869, a genus of gastropods in the family Mangeliidae, synonym of Oenopota
 Pleurotoma, a fossil genus of sponges in the order Lychniscosida, family unknown, synonym of Jima''